Hernán Elizondo Arce (October 28, 1921 in Santo Domingo de Heredia - March 22, 2012 in Esparza, Costa Rica)  is a Costa Rican novelist and poet.

Early life 
Elizondo Arce, was born, according to the official registry, in 1920 (his mother claims the date was one year later in 1921). His father was Leonardo Elizondo Bolañdo of Heredia,  a military guard and a member of  Costa Rica's first polo team, and his wife Maclovia Arce Vargas of Orotina.  Their five oldest children   were  born in Orotina, but Hernán, the youngest,  was born in Santo Domingo de Heredia.   When he was six years old, the family moved to Tilarán, Guanacaste, where he attended primary school. He claims to have gone barefoot until age sixteen.    After finishing his studies,   he worked as a rural teacher and subsequently as municipal secretary.  He left Tilarán for  San José where he worked in the National Bank,   attended high school at night and  began publishing poems in El Diaro de Costa Rica.   He then returned to Tilarán to care for his aging parents and was employed   as secretary of the high school where he finished his secondary degree.    Subsequently, he took a university correspondence course in administrative organization, and in 1967 was transferred to  Esparta where he served as assistant director of  the high school.   Earlier he had married Arracelly Vargas and with her had eight children, one of whom is deceased.

Writing career 
As a young boy Hernán Elizondo began writing poetry about his native Tilarán,  encouraged by the Catalan educator, Don Domingo Flaqué.   In 1945 at age twenty-four he published Alma, Dolar  y Paisaje,  a book of poems about  rural life.   The book   contained a prologue by Don Pepé Figueres who recognized the talent of the young poet.   A second book of poetry, Alma Criolla, appeared in 1953 and included the poem "Patria Mia" which won the Juegos Florales international prize.

Hernán Elizondo's most well-received novel, Memorias de un Pobre Diablo, was translated into German and English, saw eight editions,  and won several prizes, including  first prize in both  Juegos Florales in 1963 and  Aquileo Echeverría de Novela in 1964. This novel explored  rural Guanacaste with all its social, political and economic problems.

Several other novels followed:  La Ciudad y la Sombra, La Calle, el Jinete y Yo, Muerto al Amanecer, Adios,  Prestiño, De Este Lado de la Eternidad,  and most recently Capitán, Mi Capitán, the story of the Costa Rican war of 1948.  Hernán Elizondo  is also the author of La Ventana, a collection of stories  published in the newspaper Excelsio,  a compilation of articles published in Diario Extra  under the title Como La Ventana,  and El Santo, el Niño y el Mar,  a long story about the life of Fray Casiano of Madrid.

Hernán Elizondo, first discovered by Don Pepé Figueres, has left his mark on Costa Rican  fiction and poetry,  especially by capturing rural life in Guanacaste with  all its hardship and humanity.

Source: Camilio Rodríguez Ch., "Hernán Elizondo Arce, El poeta que descubrio Don Pepe," Mirada A La Actualidad, San José, Costa Rica,  Sept. 27 – Oct. 14, 2006, pp. 18 – 19.

Dana Greene

Bibliography

Adiós, Prestiño
La ventana
Anecdotas y relatos
De este lado de la eternidad
Alma, dolor y paisaje
Memorias de un pobre diablo
De este lado de la eternidad
Muerte al amanecer
Santo el niño y el mar
Ciudad y sombra
Calle, jinete y yo

1921 births
2012 deaths
People from Santo Domingo (canton), Costa Rica
Costa Rican people of Spanish descent
Costa Rican male writers